This is a list of mines in the Canadian province of Ontario and includes both operating and closed mines.

Adams Mine
Agnew Lake Mine
Amalgamated Larder Mine
Argonaut Mine
Armistice Mine
Associated Goldfields Mine
Barber Larder Mine
Barton Mine
Beanland Mine
Bell Creek Mine
Bidgood Mine
Bicroft Mine (uranium)
Big Dan Mine
Black Fox Mine
Buckles Mine
Campbell Mine
Can-Met Mine
Cheminis Mine
Chesterville Mine
Coleman Mine
Copper Cliff North Mine
Copper Cliff South Mine
Copperfields Mine
Coppersand Mine
Craig Mine
Creighton Mine
Denison Mine
Detour Gold Mine
Dome Mine
Dyno Mine (uranium)
Eagle River Mine
Falconbridge Mine
Faraday Mine (now Madawaska Mine)
Frood Mine
Fraser Mine
Garson Mine
Geco Mine
Goderich Salt Mines - Sifto Canada
Golden Giant Mine
Greyhawk Mine (Uranium)
Hagersville-CGC
Hemlo Mine
Hermiston-McCauley Mine
Hollinger Mines
Holloway Mine
Holt Mine
Hoyle Pond Mine
Hudson Rand Mine
Josephine Mine
Kanichee Mine
Keeley-Frontier Mine
Kerr-Addison Mine (gold)
Kidd Mine
Kirkland Gold Mine
Lac Des Iles Mine
Lacnor Mine
Laguerre Mine
Lake Shore Mine
Leckie Mine
Lockerby Mine
Macassa Mine
Madawaska Mine (uranium)
Magpie Mine
Marmoraton Mine
Martin Bird Mine
Martinson mine
McIntyre Mines
McWatters Mine
Milliken Mine
Montcalm Mine
Morris Kirkland Mine
Murray Mine
Musselwhite mine
Nickel Rim Mine
Nickel Rim South Mine
Nordic Mine
Norrie Mine
Northland Pyrite Mine
O'Connor Mine
Omega Mine
Pamour Mine
Panel Mine
Pawnee Mine
Paymaster Mine
Probe Mines
Pronto Mine
Queenston Mine
Quirke Mine
Rainy River Mine
Red Lake Mine
Redstone Mine
Sherman Mine
Sifto Salt Mine
Spanish American Mine
Stanleigh Mine
Stanrock Mine
Strathcona Mine
Sylvanite Mine
Talon Chutes
Teck-Hughes Mine
Temagami-Lorrain Mine
Thayer-Lindsay Mine
Timmins West Mine
Titan mine
Tough-Oakes (Toburn) Mine
Upper Beaver Mine
Upper Canada Mine
Victor Diamond Mine 
Windsor Salt Mine - Canadian Salt Company
Wilroy Mine
Wright-Hargreaves Mine
Young-Davidson mine

See also
List of mines in Temagami
List of mines in the Bancroft area
List of uranium mines in Ontario

References

 https://www.newgold.com/assets/rainy-river/default.aspx

Ontario